Montgomery Football Club is a Welsh football team based in the town Montgomery, Powys, Wales, who play in the Central Wales League Northern Division.

They were to play in the Ardal Leagues North East, which is in the third tier of the Welsh football league system,  but due to the COVID-19 pandemic in Wales, the country's football association cancelled what would have been the Ardal Leagues' inaugural 2020–21 season on 4 February 2021 and the club announced its withdrawal from the league on 26 March. 

For the 2021–22 season they were admitted to the Mid Wales Football League East Division. They welcomed their return to Welsh Football with the signing of Pontesbury born Robert Hartshorn, the signing demonstrated a great sign of intent from The Canaries owing to the players vast experience and ability.

Honours

Mid Wales Football League Division One – Runners-up: 2011–12; 2012–13
Mid Wales Football League Division Two – Champions: 2010–11; 2018–19
Montgomeryshire Cup – Winners: 1908–09, 1958–59, 1980–81, 2009–10, 2011–12

References

External links
Club official twitter

Football clubs in Wales
Mid Wales Football League clubs
Sport in Powys
Montgomeryshire Football League clubs
Ardal Leagues clubs